Ravnje is a village in Serbia. It is located in the Sremska Mitrovica municipality, in the Srem District, Vojvodina province. The village has a Serb ethnic majority and its population numbering 1,413 people (2002 census). Although part of the Srem District, Ravnje is situated in the region of Mačva.

Historical population

1961: 1,856
1971: 1,745
1981: 1,692
1991: 1,587

See also
List of places in Serbia
List of cities, towns and villages in Vojvodina

References

Slobodan Ćurčić, Broj stanovnika Vojvodine, Novi Sad, 1996.

Mačva
Populated places in Vojvodina
Sremska Mitrovica